O tugo jesenja (trans. Oh Autumn Sorrow) is the first studio album released in 1988 by Montenegrin-Serbian musician Rambo Amadeus.

Track listing
All songs by Rambo Amadeus, except where noted.

Personnel 
Accordion (dallape) — Saša Marković-Meksikanac
Bass, vocals, synthesizer (Sp12, Emax, Bass Synth), sampler — Vladimir Perić
keyboards — Aleksandar Habić
Synthesizer (Mirage), tambourine, handclaps — Miroslav Miša Savić
Vocals — Aleksandar Vasiljević
Vocals, guitar, goblet drum (tarabuka), drum programming (rhythm machine), keyboards, harp — Rambo Amadeus

External links
O Tugo Jesenja on Discogs
O Tugo Jesenja (reissue) on Discogs
Music section on Rambo Amadeus' official web site

1988 debut albums
Rambo Amadeus albums
PGP-RTB albums